Pseudonectriella is a genus of fungi within the Niessliaceae family. This is a monotypic genus, containing the single species Pseudonectriella ahmadii.

References

Sordariomycetes genera
Niessliaceae